New Ross Golf Club is an Irish golf club founded in 1905 and based in Tinneranny, New Ross, County Wexford, Ireland. The club's slogan is "A Pleasure to Play".

History
The land for a nine-hole golf course was acquired on Mockler's estate at Castle Annaghs, under a lease with a seven-year duration. The course was briefly relocated to the estate of Reggie Jeffares at Tinneranny in 1917, but follow Jeffares death in 1918, that lease was not renewed. The course was reopened at Annaghs in 1926 before that lease was terminated, and another course was laid out at Chilcomb Park, the present site of the Albatross factory. In 1928, the Land Commission acquired the Jeffares estate, and the Club had a permanent home under a sporting lease until 1983, when the member agreed to buy the property outright.

The period from 1991 to 1997 was probably the most progressive period in the historical development of New Ross Golf Club. In 1992, the club was among the first member clubs to grant equal rights to women.  Plans were drafted to build the current clubhouse in 1997. The clubhouse was completed and opened to members in 1998.

In 2005, its centenary year, it was decided to redesign the 11th hole building a brand new green. The 18th green was also re-designed. Further redevelopment of the 12th, 13th, 15th and 16th greens commenced in September 2008 and is due to be completed and open to play in May 2009.

The Course

The back nine has been in play for over a hundred years while the front nine has been in play since 1995. The new nine was designed by Des Smyth (2006 Ryder Cup Vice-Captain) and Declan Brannigan, and is an example of modern design with old style golfing values. In the far distance forming a spectacular backdrop to the 11th green lies the fifteen mile stretch of the Blackstairs Mountains from Dranagh to Mount Leinster, separating counties Carlow and Wexford.

In 2009, the club won the Association of Land Contractors of Ireland Award after redesigning four new greens on its course.

References

See also
 New Ross Golf Club website

Golf clubs and courses in the Republic of Ireland
Golf in Leinster
Sport in New Ross
Sports clubs in County Wexford
1905 establishments in Ireland